John Howe, 1st Baron Chedworth (died 3 April 1742) of Stowell Park, Gloucestershire was a British peer and politician.

He was the son of John Grubham Howe, of Stowell, MP and Paymaster-General. In 1712, he succeeded his father as Vice-Admiral of Gloucestershire, but was removed from office in 1715.

He was a Member of Parliament, representing the constituencies of Gloucester in 1727 and then Wiltshire from 1729 to 1741. In 1730 he inherited the estates of his cousin Sir Richard Grobham Howe, 3rd Baronet in Wiltshire and Gloucestershire.

On 12 May 1741, he was created Baron Chedworth, but died the following year. He had married, in 1712, Dorothy, the daughter of Henry Frederick Thynne (younger brother of the 1st Viscount Weymouth) of Remnan's, Old Windsor and Sunbury, Middlesex and had 8 sons and 5 daughters. He was succeeded by his eldest son, John Howe, 2nd Baron Chedworth.

References

For his father: 

Year of birth unknown
1742 deaths
1
John
Peers of Great Britain created by George II
Howe, John
Members of Parliament for Gloucester
Howe, John
Howe, John